Cars 3: Driven to Win is a 2017 racing game developed by Avalanche Software and published by Warner Bros. Interactive Entertainment. The game is based on the 2017 film Cars 3. It is the first Disney game without the involvement of Disney Interactive Studios since its closure on May 10, 2016, and the first game developed by Avalanche Software since acquired and re-established by Warner Bros. from Disney. The game was released for the Nintendo Switch, PlayStation 3, PlayStation 4, Xbox 360, Xbox One, and Wii U, on June 13, 2017, in North America, in Europe and Australia on July 14, 2017, and in Japan on July 20, 2017.

Gameplay 
The modes that appear in the game are as follows:

 Race: Players must compete to see who can get to the finish line the fastest.
 Battle Race: Racing, but with weapons.
 Takedown: Players must use weapons and power-ups to take out as many other cars as possible. When the timer runs out, the player with the most points wins.j
 Stunt Showcase: The objective here is to put on a show by performing jumps and tricks to 
 points and impress the crowds.
 Best Lap Challenge: Players must try to get the best lap time around a given course.
 Playground: A sandbox mode that allows players to go racing, perform stunts, complete challenges, or just cruise around.
 Master Level Events: Players will race with bosses. If the player wins the event it will unlock a specific character. For example, Ms. Fritter, Mater the Greater, Chick Hicks, and Jackson Storm are unlocked by winning Master Level Events.
When the player starts the game, the player starts with 0 Skill Checks. Skill Checks can be completed by completing the requirements on each one. If the player completes a certain number of Skill Checks, the player is able to unlock new events, characters, and tracks.

Playable characters 
There are a total of 23 characters to play as, with 16 of them locked in the game. To unlock them, the player must earn more Skill Checks or complete Master Level Events.

 Arvy
 Bobby Swift
 Brick Yardley
 Cam Spinner
 Chick Hicks
 Cruz Ramirez
 Dr. Damage
 Fabulous Lightning McQueen
 Guido
 Jackson Storm
 Junior Moon
 Lightning McQueen
 Louise Nash
 Mack
 Mater
 Mater the Greater
 Miss Fritter
 Natalie Certain
 Ramone
 Rich Mixon
 River Scott
 Sally
 Smokey

Notes

Reception 

Cars 3: Driven to Win received "mixed or average" reviews from critics, according to review aggregator Metacritic.

IGN España said "Cars 3: Driven to Win is a fun game to play with our children, using a Mario Kart style control, but simplifying it rightly. A good number of hours of play to unlock all its contents make the purchase worthwhile if you have children fans of the Pixar film."

References 

2017 video games
Avalanche Software games
Cars (franchise) video games
Disney video games
Multiplayer and single-player video games
Nintendo Switch games
PlayStation 3 games
PlayStation 4 games
Racing video games
Vehicular combat games
Video games based on films
Video games developed in the United States
Warner Bros. video games
Wii U games
Wii Wheel games
Wii U eShop games
Xbox 360 games
Xbox One games
Video games set in Florida
Video games set in Arizona
Video games set in London
Sports video games set in Italy
Video games set in Tokyo